Elmo David Boyd is a former wide receiver in the National Football League.

Biography
Boyd was born Elmo David Boyd on June 15, 1954, in Muleshoe, Texas.

Career
Boyd was drafted in the third round of the 1977 NFL Draft by the San Francisco 49ers and would later split the 1978 NFL season between the 49ers and the Green Bay Packers. He played at the collegiate level at Eastern Kentucky University.

See also
List of Green Bay Packers players

References

1954 births
Living people
People from Muleshoe, Texas
San Francisco 49ers players
Green Bay Packers players
American football wide receivers
Eastern Kentucky Colonels football players